Pereyezd is a rural locality (a village) in Lipinoborskoye Rural Settlement, Vashkinsky District, Vologda Oblast, Russia. The population was 2 as of 2002.

Geography 
Pereyezd is located 16 km southeast of Lipin Bor (the district's administrative centre) by road. Ukhtoma is the nearest rural locality.

References 

Rural localities in Vashkinsky District